Amyloid-related imaging abnormalities (ARIA) are abnormal differences seen in magnetic resonance imaging of the brain in patients with Alzheimer's disease. ARIA is associated with amyloid-modifying therapies, particularly human monoclonal antibodies such as aducanumab. There are two types of ARIA: ARIA-E and ARIA-H. The phenomenon was first seen in trials of bapineuzumab.

ARIA-E 
ARIA-E refers to cerebral edema, involving the breakdown of the tight endothelial junctions of the blood-brain barrier and subsequent accumulation of fluid. In a double-blind trial of the humanised monoclonal antibody solanezumab (n = 2042), sixteen patients (11 taking the drug, 5 taking a placebo), or 0.78% developed ARIA-E. A further 7 patients developed ARIA-E during an open-label extension of the trial.

The effect of ARIA-E depends on the severity and location of the edema. Symptoms may include headache, changes in mental state, confusion, vomiting, nausea, tremor and gait disturbances.

ARIA-H 
ARIA-H refers to cerebral microhaemorrhages (mH), small haemorrhages on the brain, often accompanied by hemosiderosis. mH are usually seen as small, round and low intensity lesions and are small haemosiderin deposits. Some studies define mH as being less than or equal to 10mm, while others define the cut-off as ≤ 5mm. The prevalence of mH in healthy elderly people is approximately 6%, but this value increases to between 50% and 80% in elderly people with cerebrovascular disease.

ARIA MRI Classification Criteria

References

External links 

Alzheimer's disease
Neuroimaging
Magnetic resonance imaging